Will Storr is a British author, journalist and former photographer. He has been a contributing editor at Esquire and GQ Australia. He also works as a ghostwriter and public speaker.

Career 

Storr has written six books under his own name.

His first book, Will Storr versus The Supernatural, was an investigation into people who believe in ghosts. It included a behind-the-scenes exposé of the British television show Most Haunted and an interview with Gabriele Amorth, the Vatican’s chief exorcist. Storr also tracked down Janet Hodgson, who claimed to be focus of the Enfield Poltergeist haunting in 1977.

The Heretics: Adventures with the Enemies of Science (published in the U.S. and Canada as "The Unpersuadables") was an investigation into irrational belief. Storr met creationists in Australia, the climate change denial Lord Christopher Monckton and went undercover on a trip to former World War II sites with a group of holocaust deniers and the revisionist historian David Irving.

Storr’s novel The Hunger and the Howling of Killian Lone was an adult fairy tale set in a Michelin starred kitchen in 1980s London.

Selfie: How How We Became So Self-obsessed and What It's Doing to Us was a history of the Western self. In the book, Storr discusses the rise of social media and its effects, attributing many of the more harmful ones to increased pressure on individuals and what he calls "perfectionistic styles of thinking". In 2018 The New Yorker made a short film based on the book.
 
The Science of Storytelling, was a Sunday Times Bestseller.

The Status Game described Storr’s theory about the hidden structure of social life, focusing on the need for social status and its effects on individual human life and society.

Storr also works as a ghostwriter. He wrote Ant Middleton’s memoir First Man In that was shortlisted in the 2019 British Book Awards.

Journalism 

He has covered the South Sudanese Civil War, illegal street racing in the United Kingdom, male suicides, the Lord’s Resistance Army in Uganda, the abuse of sugar crop workers in El Salvador, and the race-hate killing of an Aboriginal man in Australia.
 He has written for media outlets including The Guardian, The Observer, The New York Times, The New Yorker, and The Times.

He received a One World Media award, an Amnesty International award for his work regarding sexual violence against men, and an AIB award for Best Investigative Documentary in 2013 for An Unspeakable Act, a BBC World Service documentary covering human rights abuses in the Democratic Republic of the Congo.

During his reporting in South Sudan Storr was abducted by a militia and narrowly avoided being executed.

He has also been a guest on podcasts including Under The Skin with Russell Brand, The Jordan Harbinger Show, and The Ezra Klein Show.

Photography 

His portraits of survivors of the Lord's Resistance Army, a heterodox Christian rebel group, have been exhibited at Oxo Tower.

Personal life 

He is married to Farrah Storr. His great-great uncle is the journalist, government reformer and author of the Self-Help, Samuel Smiles.

Selected bibliography 

 Will Storr vs. The Supernatural: One Man's Search for the Truth About Ghosts (2006) 
 The Heretics: Adventures With The Enemies Of Science (2013) 
 The Unpersuadables: Adventures with the Enemies of Science (2014) 
 The Hunger and the Howling of Killian Lone (2014) 
 Selfie: How We Became So Self-Obsessed and What It's Doing to Us (2017) 
 The Science of Storytelling (2019) 
 The Status Game: On Social Position and How We Use It (2021)

References 

Living people
British opinion journalists
British male journalists
21st-century British male writers
21st-century British photographers
Year of birth missing (living people)